The Coreen & District Football League was an Australian rules football competition in the Coreen district of the Riverina in New South Wales, initially formed in 1909. The netball competition commenced in 1972 in line with the football fixture. The league was disbanded at the end of the 2007 season after 99 years of competition.

History: 1901 to 1931
It appears that the Coreen & District Football Association superseded the Federal Football Association and was formed after a meeting at Matt O'Brien's Burraja Hotel in April, 1909, from the following teams of - Burrajaa, Coreen, Redlands, Ringwood and Shannonvale. The Urana District Football Association was also formed in 1909 and catered for the Daysdale, Oaklands and Urana football clubs.

Over the years the Coreen and District Football Association appears to have had a number of minor name changes to its title, swapping between "Shire" and "District" depending on the journalist's review of a meeting or what the newspaper editor chose as the association's name at that particular time or the title may of been abbreviated in the newspaper. It is difficult to accurately state what the official title of the association was without viewing the official minutes of meetings. What is of particular importance is the actual club's that competed in the association each year.

In 1915, there was some opposition from locals expressing their opinion that young men playing football, would be better off serving their King and Country in the trenches to fight the enemies of the Empire, but the season was completed before going into recess from 1916 to 1918 due to WW1.

In 1917, former Coreen Settler's FC captain, Ambrose Charles Filliponi was killed in action in France.

The most radical change came in 1931, when the Coreen & DFA folded and three clubs joined the Corowa & District Football Association, then in 1936, the Corowa & DFA officially changed its title to the Coreen & DFA. More details below in the "History:1930 to 2007" section.

Coreen FC played in nine consecutive grand finals between 1924 and 1931, winning three Coreen & DFA premierships in 1926, 1929 and 1930.

There were a number of football associations formed in the early 1900s that local club's played in prior joining the Coreen & District Football Association in 1909. These associations played a vital role in providing football competitions in the Riverina and along the Murray River in local football's formative years prior to the Coreen & DFA being established in 1909.

Riverina Football Association - 1901 Teams Bull Plain, Burryjaa, Clear Hills, Daysdale. Premiers: Burryjaa FC
Clear Hills Football Association - 1902 - 1903 
1902 Teams: Burryjaa, Clear Hills, Daysdale and Savernake. Premiers: Savenake FC
1903 Teams: Clear Hills, Daysdale and Savernake. Premiers: Daysdale FC.
1904 - The re-forming of Clear Hills Football Association fell through as Clear Hills FC refused to play against Daysdale, under their present captain. Savenake then joined the Berrigan Football Association.
Federal Football Association - 1905 to 1908
There was a Riverina football competition established in 1905 around the Corowa and Mulwala area called the Federal Football Association.
1905 Teams: Burryjaa, Daysdale and Savenake, 1905 premiers: Daysdale FC 
1906 Teams: Clear Hills, Coreen, Daysdale and Savenake, 1906 Premiers: Daysdale defeated Clear Hills in the grand final. 
1907 Teams: Burryja, Clear Hills, Coreen, Daysdale and Savenake with Clear Hills and Daysdale tying on ladder points for the premiership. 1907 Premiers: Clear Hills defeated Daysdale in the play off to win the 1907 premiership. 
1908 Teams: Burryja, Balldale, Coreen, Daysdale, Ringwood and Savernake. In 1908 there was very little football information available in the newspapers, but the Federal FA did advertise for Umpires in May, 1908. and in a May, 1908 article it states that Balldale FC joined a Coreen & District Football Association competition ? In the grand final, Balldale defeated Daysdale at Burrajaa to win the 1908 grand final.

Corowa & District Football Association - 1906 & 1907.
In 1906 the Corowa and District Football Association was formed and the following teams entered this competition – Balldale, Burryjaa, Corowa, Howlong and Wahgunyah. Corowa Football Club went onto win the premiership, finishing on top of the ladder, with seven wins from eight games. 
In 1907, Burrajaa joined the Federal FA, and the Corowa & DFA premiership was won by the Wahgunyah Football Club.
In 1908, Corowa and Wahgunyah joined the Ovens & Murray Football Association, while Howlong FC won the Ovens & Murray Junior Football Association premiership in 1908.

Note: The football club of Burrajaa, Burryjaa, Burryja, was spelt in a variety of ways in various newspapers between 1900 and 1950, with the most recent spelling of the club being settled as - "Buraja".

Teams in the Coreen & DFL: 1909 to 1930

 1909: Coreen & District Football Association Teams:5. Burrajaa, Coreen, Redlands, Ringwood and Shannonvale.
 1910: Coreen District Football Association Teams:6. Burrajaa, Burrajaa Village, Coreen, Coreen Settlers, Daysdale and Ringwood.
 1911: Coreen Shire Football Association Teams:6. Burrajaa, Burrajaa Village, Coreen, Coreen Settlers, Daysdale and Savenake.
 1912: Coreen District Football Association Teams:4. Burrajaa Village, Coreen Settler's, Daysdale and Oaklands.
 1913: Coreen & District Football Association Teams:4. Burryjaa, Coreen, Coreen Settlers and Daysdale.
 1914: Coreen Shire Football Association. Teams:7. Balldale, Burrajaa, Burrajaa Village, Coreen, Coreen Settlers, Daysdale and Ringwood.
 1915: Coreen Shire Football Association Teams:6. Balldale, Daysdale, Coreen Settlers, Lowesdale, Lowesdale Military and Redlands. 
 1916–1918: In recess – World War I
 1919: Coreen District Football Association consisting of following five teams - Balldale, Buraja, Coreen, Daysdale and Oaklands.
 1920: Coreen District Football Association. Teams:6. Balldale, Burraja, Coreen, Corowa, Daysdale and Oaklands.
 1921: Coreen & District Football Association. Teams:6. Balldale, Burryjaa, Coreen, Daysdale, Hopefield and Ringwood.
 1922: Coreen Football Association. Teams:7. Balldale, Burryjaa, Coreen, Daysdale, Hopefield, Ringwood and Wahgunyah.
 1923: Coreen Football Association. Teams:4. Balldale, Burryjaa, Coreen and Daysdale.
 1924: Coreen & District Football Association. Teams:5. Burrajaa, Coreen, Daysdale, Ringwood and Savernake.
1925: Coreen & District Football Association. Teams:6. Buraja, Coreen, Daysdale, Oaklands, Ringwood and Savernake.
 1926: Coreen & District Football Association. Teams:6. Buraja, Coreen, Daysdale, Oaklands, Ringwood and Savernake.
 1927: Coreen & District Football Association. Teams:6. Buraja, Coreen, Daysdale, Oaklands, Ringwood and Savernake.
 1928: Coreen & District Football Association. Teams:6. Buraja, Coreen, Daysdale, Oaklands, Ringwood and Savernake.
 1929: Coreen & District Football Association. Teams:6. Buraja, Coreen, Daysdale, Oaklands, Rand and Urana.
 1930: Coreen & District Football Association. Teams:6. Coreen, Daysdale, Oaklands, Rand, Savernake and Urana.
1930: Corowa & District Football Association. Teams:6. Balldale, Brocklesby, Burraja, Corowa Stars, Howlong and Wahgunyah.

The season of 1930 ended in dispute. Oaklands had played a man named Kennedy, with whom didn't meet the associations residency rules. A protest by the Coreen club led to the forfeiture of points and thus expulsion from the finals. Oaklands appealed the decision but the matter was not heard until long after the season and finals had been played. Eventually the appeal by Oaklands was upheld. Ill will between clubs led to Urana and Oaklands withdrawing from the association and joining another competition. The remaining clubs knowing that a three team competition wasn't ideal so they sort to play elsewhere.

1931: Coreen, Daysdale and Rand joined the Corowa & District FA in 1931, while Oaklands and Urana joined the Southern Riverina Football Association in 1931. In 1932, Oaklands and Urana both joined the Corowa & District Football Association, while Rand joined the Central Hume Football League in 1932.

Premierships: 1909 to 1930
Coreen & District Football Association

1909 - Ringwood d Burryjaa (undefeated)
1910 - Daysdale d Ringwood
1911 - Daysdale (undefeated)
1912 - 1st: Daysdale 2nd: Coreen Settler's
1913 - Coreen Settler's d Daysdale
1914 - Coreen Settler's d Daysdale (undefeated)
1915 - Lowesdale Military d Daysdale
1916 - In recess: WWI
1917 - In recess: WWI
1918 - In recess: WWI
1919 - Coreen d Burryjaa who refused to play in the grand final at Daysdale.
1920 - Corowa d Daysdale
1921 - Balldale d Buraja
1922 - Balldale d Buraja
1923 - Balldale d Daysdale
1924 - Buraja d Coreen
1925 - Ringwood d Coreen
1926 - Coreen d Oaklands
1927 - Oaklands d Coreen
1928 - Oaklands d Coreen
1929 - Oaklands d Coreen (1st grand final)
1929 - Coreen d Oaklands (grand final replay due to protest & appeal)
1930 - Coreen d Rand

Coreen & DFA Clubs: 1909 to 1930
Balldale: 1914 & 1915, 1919 - 1923. Joined the Riverina Main Line Football Association in 1924. 
Burrajaa: 1909 - 1911, 1913 & 1914. Merged with Burrajaa Village FC to form Lowesdale FC in 1915. 1919 - 1929. Joined the Corowa & DFA in 1930
Burrajaa Village: 1910 - 1912, 1914. Merged with Burrajaa FC to form Lowesdale FC in 1915.
Coreen: 1909 - 11, (Coreen may of been in recess in 1912), 1913 & 1914, 1915 - merged with Coreen Settler's, (1916 - 1918 in recess - WW1), 1919 - 1930. Joined the Corowa & DFA in 1931.
Coreen Settlers: 1910 - 1915. Most likely reverted to Coreen FC in 1919 after WW1.
Corowa: 1920. Re-joined the Ovens & Murray Football League in 1921 and played there until 1940. 
Daysdale: 1910 - 1915, 1919 - 30. Joined the Corowa & DFA in 1931.
Hopefield: 1922. Went into recess until 1946, when they re-joined the Coreen & DFA and played there until 1949. Merged with Burrajaa in 1950.
Lowesdale: 1915. Club folded in 1916 due to WWI.
Lowesdale Military: 1915. Club folded due to WWI.
Oaklands (black & white): 1912, 1925 - 1930. Joined the Southern Riverina Football Association in 1931
Rand (blue & gold): 1929 & 1930. Joined the Corowa & DFA in 1931. Rand played in the Central Hume Football Association from 1932 to 1934. Rejoined the Coreen & DFL in 1935.
Redlands: 1909 & 1915. Club folded.
Ringwood: 1909 & 1910, 1914, 1921 & 1922, 1924 - 1928. Club folded. 
Savernake: 1911, 1924 - 1928, 1930. Club folded.
Shannonvale: 1909. Club folded.
Urana (pale blue & gold): 1929 & 1930. Joined the Southern Riverina Football Association in 1931.
Wahgunyah: 1922. Joined the Chiltern & District Football Association in 1923 and played there until 1929, then joined the Corowa & DFA in 1930.

History:1930 to 2007

The 1930 season of Coreen & District Football Association competition coincided with the first season of the Corowa and District Football Association, with Balldale winning the first of three consecutive Corowa & DFA premierships.

As a result of a protest by the Oaklands FC and then an appeal to the Wagga Football Council and NSW National Football League as to the make up of the 1930 Coreen and District Football Association finals series and participating teams, due to a dispute over the eligibility of an Oaklands player, the Coreen & DFA folded after a delegates meeting in May, 1931, when it was moved 'that the forming of the association be temporarily suspended' with Coreen, Daysdale and Rand then joining the Corowa & DFA competition in 1931. Balldale then went on to defeat Coreen in the 1931 Corowa & District FA grand final.

The Corowa and District competition ran from 1930 until 1935 when it took on the Coreen & District FA's name at its 1936 Annual General Meeting.

In 1930, Mr. Jack Anderson - Balldale FC and W Hall - Howlong FC tied for the Pearce Medal for the best and fairest player award in the Corowa & District Football Association

Corowa Stars played in the Corowa & District FA from 1930 to 1933. Corowa Stars decided to reform after their 1934 – AGM, but it appears they never got up and going and did not enter a team in any local competition and ultimately folded.

Rand were undefeated during their 1937 premiership year.

In 1944, there was a Coreen & District Junior Patriotic Football Association with Rennie defeating Coreen in the grand final at Coreen.

There was a Coreen & District Junior Football League in 1945 with Oaklands defeating Rennie in the grand final which was played at Coreen.

The Coreen & District Football Association reformed in April, 1946 after WW2 from the following six clubs - Coreen, Daysdale, Hopefield, Oaklands, Rennie and Urana.

In 1953, Coreen FC President, Jack Kingston was re-elected for the 49th year.

Daysdale played in six consecutive grand finals between 1961 and 1966, winning three premierships in 1961, 1962 and 1964.

The junior (Under 16) competition commenced in 1975 and proved to be a very worth while breeding ground for future players, with several going onto to play VFL / AFL football, such as - John Longmire, Adam Houlihan, Damian Houlihan and Taylor Duryea.

In 1994 the league comprised ten clubs: Coleambally, Coreen, Daysdale, Hopefield-Buraja, Jerilderie, Oaklands, Rand, Rennie, Urana and Victorian club Wahgunyah.  It was also in that year that the Daysdale FC celebrated their 100th anniversary and they went onto win the senior football premiership.

Jerilderie played in seven consecutive grand finals between 1995 and 2001, but only won two in 1999 and 2001.

The Billabong Crows FC were formed when the Oaklands Football Club and Urana Football Club, both of which had been long standing rivals in the Coreen & District Football League, elected to merge in 2004.

The six remaining Coreen & DFL clubs joined the following leagues during the 2007 post-season.
 Billabong Crows: Hume Football League
 Coreen-Daysdale-Hopefield-Buraja United: Hume Football League
 Coleambally: Hume Football League (Joined Farrer Football League in 2011)
 Jerilderie: Picola & District Football League 
 Rennie: Hume Football League (Joined Picola & District Football League in 2009)
 Wahgunyah: Tallangatta & District Football League

Former Clubs: 1930–2006
 Balldale (1930–1934; 1974–1977) (blue & gold). Club folded.
 Blighty (1965–1968). Joined the Picola & District Football League in 1969.
 Boree Creek (1976–1978). Came from the Hume Football League in 1976. Club folded after 1978, then re-formed in 1982 to play in the Farrer Football League for one season, then folded for good.
 Brocklesby (1930) Joined the Albury & District Football League in 1931.
 Buraja (1930–1949). Became Hopfield Buraja FC in 1950.
 Coreen "Swans" (1931–1994). In 1995 merged with Daysdale to form the Coreen Daysdale United FC.
 Coreen-Daysdale "Saints" (1995–2005). in 2006 merged with Hopefield Buraja in 2006 to form the Coreen Daysdale Hopefield Buraja United FC "Saints". 
 Corowa Stars "Stars"(1930–1933). Club folded after their 1934 AGM.
 Daysdale "Magpies" (1931–1994). In 1995 merged with Coreen to form the Coreen Daydale United FC.
 Hopefield (1946-1949). Merged with Buraja in 1950 to become Hopefield Buraja FC in 1950. 
 Hopefield-Buraja "Bulldogs" (1950–2003).  In recess in 2004 and 2005, then in 2006 merged with Coreen Daysdale to form Coreen Daysdale Hopefield Buraja United FC "Saints". 
 Mulwala (1939–1940). Played in the Murray Valley North-East Football League in 1946 and 1947.
 Murray Magpies "Magpies" (1999–2006). Joined the Hume Football League in 2007.
 Oaklands "Hawks" (1932–2003). Merged with Urana FC to form the Billabong Crows FC in 2004 in the Coreen & DFA.
 Rand "Pigeons" (1930; 1935–2005). Merged with Walbundrie FC in 2006 and joined the Hume Football League.
 Rennie"Grasshoppers"(1932–2007). joined the Hume Football League in 2008, then joined the Picola & District Football League in 2009.
 Rutherglen Corowa "Cats" (1979–1991). Played in the Ovens & King Football League from 1992 to 2003.
 Rutherglen Reserves "Redlegs"(1950–1952). Joined the Ovens & Murray Football League Reserves competition in 1953.
 South Corowa (1947–1956). Withdrew from the Coreen & DFA in April, 1957 and subsequently folded.
 Urana "Bombers" (1932-1935;1946–1951;1973–2003). Merged with Oaklands FC to form the Billabong Crows in 2004 in the Coreen & DFA.
 Urana-Cullivel "Spiders"'' (1952–1972)

Premierships: Football: 1930 to 2007

Senior Premierships: 1930–2007
Coreen & District Football Association - 1909 to 1930.
Corowa & District Football Association - 1930 to 1935.
Coreen & District Football League - 1936 to 2007.

 CDHBU: Coreen Daysdale Hopefield Buraja United

Reserves: 1976–2007

 1976: Oaklands
 1977: Wahgunyah  
 1978: Wahgunyah
 1979: Rutherglen-Corowa 
 1980: Rennie d Rutherglen-Corowa
 1981: Hopefield-Buraja d Rutherglen-Corowa
 1982: Rutherglen-Corowa d Hopefield Buraja
 1983: Rennie d Wahgunyah
 1984: Wahgunyah d Rutherglen-Corowa
 1985: Rutherglen-Corowa d Wahgunyah
 1986: Rutherglen-Corowa d Hopefield Buraja
 1987: Rutherglen-Corowa d Coreen
 1988: Rutherglen-Corowa d Wahgunyah
 1989: Rennie d Rutherglen-Corowa
 1990: Rennie d Rutherglen-Corowa
 1991: Coreen d Rutherglen-Corowa
 1992: Coreen d Wahgunyah
 1993: Coreen d Wahgunyah
 1994: Coreen d Rand
 1995: Rennie d Coreen
 1996: Rennie d Coleabally
 1997: Wahgunyah 
 1998: Coleabally d Wahgunyah
 1999: Wahgunyah
 2000: Murray Magpies  
 2001: Murray Magpies d Coleabally
 2002: Wahgunyah d CDHBU
 2003: Coleabally d Murray Magpies
 2004: Wahgunyah d Murray Magpies
 2005: Coreen-Daysdale d Murray Magpies
 2006: Coleabally d CDHBU
 2007: Wahgunyah d Billabong Crows

Thirds / Under 16s: 1980–2007

 1975: Hopefield Buraaja c Oaklands
 1976: Oaklands d Daysdale
 1977: Hopefield Buraaja d Oaklands
 1978: Wahgunyah d Oaklands
 1979: Rutherglen-Corowa d Hopefield Buraaja
 1980: Rutherglen-Corowa d Daysdale
 1981: Rutherglen-Corowa d Wahgunyah
 1982: Rutherglen-Corowa d Hopefield Buraja
 1983: Rutherglen-Corowa d Rennie
 1984: Rutherglen-Corowa d Rennie
 1985: Rutherglen-Corowa d Rennie
 1986: Rennie d Rutherglen-Corowa
 1987: Wahgunyah d Rutherglen-Corowa
 1988: Hopefield-Buraja d Rutherglen-Corowa
 1989: Urana d Wahgunyah
 1990: Rutherglen-Corowa d Oaklands
 1991: Oaklands d Wahgunyah
 1992: Oaklands d Hopefield Buraja
 1993: Oaklands d Coleambally
 1994: Jerilderie d Coleambally
 1995: Coleambally d Rand
 1996: Rand d Hopefield Buraja
 1997: Jerilderie 
 1998: Wahgunyah d CDHBU
 1999: Murray Magpies
 2000: Murray Magpies  
 2001: Coleambally d Jerilderie
 2002: Jerilderie d Wahgunyah
 2003: Coreen-Daysdale d Jerilderie
 2004: Jerilderie d CDHBU
 2005: Jerilderie d CDHBU
 2006: Jerilderie d Wahgunyah
 2007: Wahgunyah d Jerilderie

Fourths / Under 13s: 2006–2007

 2006: Rennie  d Coreen-Daysdale-Hopefield-Buraja United
 2007: Coreen-Daysdale-Hopefield-Buraja United d Billabong Crows

Senior Football Awards

Coreen & District Football League Best & Fairest Award & Leading Goalkicker Awards
Senior Football
Mr. F A Pearce of Corowa donated a best and fairest medal in 1930.
In 1932, Mr. Fred Mason donated a gold medal for the best and fairest player, to be decided on by votes from the match umpires. 
The Kingston Cup was first awarded in 1938 and donated by Mr. Jack Kingston.
Charles A. Wilson Medal (Wilson was a former Secretary of the Coreen & DFA & the medal donor)
Archie Dennis Memorial Trophy / Medal. Archie Crawford Dennis was a former Rennie farmer, 1938 Rennie premiership player, Coreen & DFA representative player, Corowa footballer and former President (1946) and Vice President of the Coreen & DFA, who died tragically in a motor car accident in 1948, aged 36. He was a WW2 veteran too. The award was changed from a trophy to a medal in 1983.

 Oldest winner: 1966: John Voss, Wahgunyah, 37 years old.
 Youngest winner: 1963: Mick Dowdle, Jerilderie, 16 years old.
 Four x Archie Denis Medal wins: John Voss, Wahgunyah; Peter Carroll, Coreen and Tyson Maloney, Oaklands & Billabong Crows.
 Ray Warford also won three Ovens & King Football League best and fairest awards in 1953, 1955 and 1956 with Moyhu FC. Warford also played in Granya's 1946 Tallangatta & District Football League's premiership and played with South Melbourne Football Club Reserves in 1949. He then played in Wangaratta's 1950 Ovens & Murray Football League premiership.
 Jim Sandral also won three Ovens & Murray Football League best and fairest awards in 1959, 1962 and 1964 with Corowa. Sandral was also runner up in Archie Denis Medal in 1966, 67, 68, 69 and 1970. 1956 - Melbourne Football Club VFL premiership player.

1995 - Won on a countback from Robbie Burgess - Urana & C Williams - Oaklands.
 
Most goals in a senior C&DFL match
24 - Peter Lovell - 1985 - Coleambally v Rand
22 - Peter Tobias - 1985 - Wahgunyah v Hopefield Buraja 
20 - Johnathan Creenaune - 2004 - Coreen Daysdale Hopefield Buraja United v Urana

Most goals in a finals series
 Elimination Final: 
 Qualifying Final: 
 First Semi Final: 11 - B Hill v Rand, 1994
 Second Semi Final: 10 - Phil Azzi, Brocklesby v Corowa Stars, 1930 & 10 - Rod Lavis, Hopefield Buraja v Oaklands, 1982
 Preliminary Final: 11 - D Quirk, Coreen v Urana, 1952
 Grand Final: 10 - George Tobias, Rennie v Coreen, 1983

Reserves Football Awards
This Coreen & DFL Reserves competition commenced in 1980.

Thirds Football Awards
This Coreen & DFL Thirds (Under16's) football competition commenced in 1975.

1990 - Danny Shiers won on a countback from Bradley Roach.
 Between 1993 and 2007, the Thirds goalkicking totals were not published in the Coreen & DFA grand final record.

2005 Ladder 
																		
																		
FINALS

2006 Ladder 
																		
																		
FINALS

2007: 99th & Final Season

Coreen & DFL - Office Bearers

See also
AFL NSW/ACT
Australian rules football in New South Wales

References

External links

Coreen & District Football League Finals History Book, 1894-1994. Compiled by Alan Norman, foreword by Dave Lewis
Coreen & DFL Football Records Collection
Official Coreen & District Football League website
1914 - Coreen & District FA Premiers: Coreen Settlers FC team photo
1938 - Coreen & District Football Association Officials
1939 - Coreen & District FA Premiers: Rennie FC team photo
1946 - Coreen FC & Rennie FC team photos
1947 - Hopefield FC team photo
1949 - Coreen & District FA Premiers: Wahgunyah FC team photo
1960 - Coreen & District FL Premiers: Hopefield Buraja FC team photo
2007 - Farewell Coreen League
Local footy to honour old Coreen League

Australian rules football in Australia
Defunct Australian rules football competitions in New South Wales
Sport in the Riverina
Sports leagues established in 1909
1909 establishments in Australia
2007 disestablishments in Australia